The Indian Society of Remote Sensing (ISRS) is an Indian learned society devoted to remote sensing; it was created in 1969 and has more than 5000 members. It is a national member of the International Society for Photogrammetry and Remote Sensing.  
ISRS publishes the Journal of the Indian Society of Remote Sensing.

See also 
 American Society for Photogrammetry and Remote Sensing

References

Further reading 
 

Remote sensing organizations
Scientific societies based in India